Guraleus is a genus of sea snails, marine gastropod mollusks in the family Mangeliidae.

Description
The thin shell  is fusiform or subcylindrical. The colour ranges from uniform buff, with or without chocolate spiral lines or bands, to entire chocolate. The protoconch consists of two or three smooth helicoid whorls. Fasciole don't interrupt the sculpture, and are scarcely indicated by the curvature of growth lines.

Sculpture :—The radials vary from bold spaced ribs projecting at the shoulder to fine close riblets. The entire shell, except the protoconch, is overrun with fine, close, beaded or unbeaded threads. The aperture measures about half the length of the shell, with or without armature. The outer lip is slightly inflected. The sinus is subsutural, deeply rounded. The siphonal canal is short and open.

Distribution
This genus of marine species occurs off Sumatra (Indonesia) and Australia (New South Wales, Queensland, South Australia, Tasmania, Victoria, Western Australia). One species, Guraleus amplexus, occurs off South Africa, another, Guraleus kamakuranus off Japan and Korea.

Species
According to the World Register of Marine Species (WoRMS) the following species with valid names are included within the genus Guraleus :

 Guraleus alucinans (Sowerby III, 1896)
 Guraleus amplexus (Gould, 1860)
 Guraleus anisus (Cotton, 1947)
 Guraleus asper Laseron, 1954
 Guraleus australis (Adams & Angas, 1864)
 Guraleus bordaensis Cotton, 1947
 Guraleus brazieri (Angas, 1871)
 Guraleus colmani Shuto, 1983
 Guraleus cuspis (Sowerby III, 1896)
 Guraleus delicatulus (Tenison-Woods, 1879)
 Guraleus deshayesii (Dunker, 1860)
 Guraleus diacritus Cotton, 1947
 † Guraleus dubius Maxwell, 1992 
 Guraleus fallaciosa (Sowerby III, 1896): mentioned in OBIS as Guraleus (Guraleus) fallaciosus (Sowerby, 1897) 
 Guraleus fascinus Hedley, 1922
 Guraleus flaccidus (Pritchard & Gatliff, 1899):
 Guraleus flavescens (Angas, 1877)
 Guraleus florus Cotton, 1947
 Guraleus fossa Laseron, 1954
 Guraleus halmahericus (Schepman, 1913)
 Guraleus himerodes (Melvill & Standen, 1896)
 Guraleus incrusta (Tenison-Woods, 1877)
 Guraleus jacksonensis (Angas, 1877)
 Guraleus kamakuranus (Pilsbry, 1904)
 Guraleus lallemantianus (Crosse & Fischer, 1865)
 Guraleus mitralis (Adams & Angas, 1864)
 Guraleus nanus Laseron, 1954
 Guraleus ornatus (Sowerby III, 1896)
 Guraleus pictus (Adams & Angas, 1864) 
 Guraleus savuensis (Schepman, 1913)
 Guraleus semicarinatus  (H.A. Pilsbry, 1904)
 Guraleus tabatensis (Tokunaga, 1906)
 Guraleus tasmanicus (Tenison-Woods, 1876)
 Guraleus tasmantis Laseron, 1954
 Guraleus thornleyanus (Laseron, 1954)
 Guraleus tokunagae (Finlay, 1926)
 Guraleus verhoeffeni (Martens, 1904)
 Guraleus wilesianus Hedley, 1922

Species brought into synonymy
 Guraleus bellus (Adams, A. & G.F. Angas, 1864): synonym of Antiguraleus adcocki (G. B. Sowerby III, 1896) 
 Guraleus comptus (Adams & Angas, 1864): synonym of Marita compta (A. Adams & Angas, 1864) 
 Guraleus costatus Hedley, 1922: synonym of Antiguraleus costatus (Hedley, 1922)
 † Guraleus cuspidatus Chapple, 1934: synonym of † Pleurotomella cuspidata (Chapple, 1934)
 Guraleus inornatus (Sowerby, 1897): synonym of Marita inornata (Sowerby III, 1896)
 Guraleus insculptus (Adams & Angas, 1864): synonym of Marita insculpta (Adams & Angas, 1864)
 Guraleus letouneuxianus Crosse and Fischer, 1865: synonym of Turrella letourneuxiana (Crosse and Fischer, 1865)
 Guraleus morologus Hedley, 1922: synonym of  Turrella morologus (Hedley, 1922)
 Guraleus nitidus Hedley, 1922 : synonym of Marita nitidus (Hedley, 1922)
 Guraleus permutatus Hedley, 1922  : synonym of  Antiguraleus permutatus (Hedley, 1922)
 Guraleus pulchripicta (Melvill & Standen, 1901): synonym of Lienardia pulchripictus (Melvill & Standen, 1901)
 Guraleus schoutenensis May, 1901: synonym of Marita schoutenensis (May, 1911)
 Guraleus vulgata (J.Thiele, 1925);: synonym of Mangelia vulgata J. Thiele, 1925 (taxon inquirendum)

References

 Hedley C. 1922. A revision of the Australian Turridae. Records of the Australian Museum 13(6): 213-359

External links
  Bouchet P., Kantor Yu.I., Sysoev A. & Puillandre N. (2011) A new operational classification of the Conoidea. Journal of Molluscan Studies 77: 273-308.
 Worldwide Mollusc Species Data Base: Mangeliidae
  Powell, Arthur William Baden. "The Australian Tertiary Mollusca of the Family Turridae." Records of the Auckland Institute and Museum 3.1 (1944): 3-68.
  Tucker, J.K. 2004 Catalog of recent and fossil turrids (Mollusca: Gastropoda). Zootaxa 682:1-1295.

 
Gastropod genera